Graham Norton's Bigger Picture (previously named The Bigger Picture with Graham Norton) is a British comedy panel chat show broadcast on BBC One from 1 August 2005 until 20 November 2006, in which presenter Graham Norton informally and satirically discusses the week's news with a panel of invited celebrity guests. The show begins with the celebrities being shown in mocked-up photographs of themselves in scenes involving other celebrities, and ends with the guests introducing other mocked up photographs that humorously explain the recent behaviour of other celebrities.

Episodes

Series 1
The guests for the series were:

Series 2
The guests for the series were:

Series 3
The guests for the series were:

References

External links
 
 

Graham Norton
2005 British television series debuts
2006 British television series endings
BBC television comedy
English-language television shows
Television series by ITV Studios